Dark Waters may refer to:

Books and art
Dark Waters, a book by Catherine MacPhail nominated for the 2002 Carnegie Medal
"Dark Waters", an exhibition on the Thames for the London Festival of Architecture 2008

Games
"Dark Waters", a popular add-on for the Neverwinter Nights 2 computer game
Risen 2: Dark Waters, a 2012 video game

Film and TV 
Dark Waters (1944 film), a film starring Merle Oberon and Franchot Tone - a woman is targeted for her inheritance
Dark Waters (1956 film), a film starring Omar Sharif
Dark Waters (1994 film), a horror film
Dark Waters (2019 film), directed by Todd Haynes, a legal thriller concerning chemical contamination of a town
"Dark Waters" (Arrow), an episode of the fourth season of Arrow
"Dark Waters" (Once Upon a Time), an episode of the sixth season of Once Upon a Time

Music
Dark Waters (album), a 2023 album by Delain
Dark Waters, a 1950 opera by Ernst Krenek

Songs
"Dark Waters", a song from the 2001 album In Search of Truth by Swedish band Evergrey
"Dark Waters", a song on the 2005 reissue album More Music for Films
"Dark Waters", a song from the debut God Forbid 1999 album Reject the Sickness

See also
Dark Water (disambiguation)